Grape Creek is an unincorporated community in Cherokee County, in the U.S. state of North Carolina.

History
A post office called Grape Creek was established in 1859, and remained in operation until 1914. The community took its name from a nearby stream of the same name.

References

Unincorporated communities in North Carolina
Unincorporated communities in Cherokee County, North Carolina